Purgatorius is a genus of seven extinct eutherian species typically believed to be the earliest example of a primate or a proto-primate, a primatomorph precursor to the Plesiadapiformes, dating to as old as 66 million years ago. The first remains (P. unio and P. ceratops) were reported in 1965, from what is now eastern Montana's Tullock Formation (early Paleocene, Puercan), specifically at Purgatory Hill (hence the animal's name) in deposits believed to be about 63 million years old, and at Harbicht Hill in the lower Paleocene section of the Hell Creek Formation. Both locations are in McCone County, Montana.

They have also been found in the Ravenscrag Formation and widely discovered in the early Paleocene Bug Creek Group, along with leptictids. These deposits were once thought to be late Cretaceous, but it is now clear that they are Paleocene channels with time-averaged fossil assemblages. It is thought to have been rat-sized ( long and 1.3 ounces (about 37 grams)) and a diurnal insectivore, which burrowed through small holes in the ground. In life, it would have resembled a squirrel or a tree shrew (most likely the latter, given that tree shrews are the closest living relatives of primates, and Purgatorius is considered to be the progenitor to primates). The youngest remains of Purgatorius date back to ~65.921 mya, or between 105 thousand to 139 thousand years after the K-Pg boundary.

Description of remains

Postcanine dentition of P. unio is documented by 13 dentulous, fragmentary mandibles, a fragmentary maxillary and more than 50 isolated teeth from Garbani Locality 80 km west of Purgatory Hill. P. ceratops is represented by an isolated lower molar found at Harbicht Hill, McCone County. The report of the occurrence of Purgatorius in the Late Cretaceous was based on an isolated, worn molar found in a channel filling that contains early Puercan fossils. It is also abundantly represented in Pu 2-3 local faunas in the northwestern interior, suggesting that it came into the area between 64.75 and 64.11 Mya. Fragmentary dentition from the Garbani Channel fauna from Purgatorius janisae shows that the lower dental formula was 3.1.4.3.

Dentition
The type specimen of P. unio, a damaged upper molar, is essentially identical to teeth found at the Garbani Locality. Data from this sample support Van Valen and Sloan's identification of topotypic lower molars, and also demonstrate that the lower dentition of P. unio includes seven postcanines. The alveolus for the single root of P1, crown unknown, is smaller than those for the canine or P2. The second lower pre- molar is smaller than P3; both are two- rooted. The fourth lower premolar is submolariform. A metaconid is lacking, although on some teeth slight thickenings of the enamel are present in this region. Talonid cusps are slightly differentiated. The first and second lower molars are approximately the same length (M1, average length x=- 1.93 mm, N- 13; M2, x=2.00 mm, N- 9); M. is longer (x= 2.32 mm, N -7). Widths of talonids of M1.2 vary from less than to greater than widths of trigonids. Hypoconulid of M. is enlarged, salient, and on some teeth incipiently doubled by addition of a lingual cusp.

Ankle bones
Bones from the ankle are similar to those of primates, and were suited for a life up in trees.

Relationship
For many years, there has been  debate as to whether Purgatorius is a primitive member of the primates or a basal member of the Plesiadapiforms. Several characters of the dentition of Purgatorius, which includes its incisor morphology, can ally it with later plesiadapiforms. The prism cross sections are highly variable with circular, horseshoe and irregular shapes, while the prisms of cheek teeth are radially arranged. Due to the fragmentary dentaries found in the Garbani Channel fauna from Purgatorius janisae the morphology of the canine and incisor alveoli suggest the derived gradient in the crown size of: I1>or = I2>I3<C. Isolated upper incisors referable from P. janisae exhibit some typical plesiadapiform specializations. Due to general morphology of the postcanine dentition of Purgatorius, it could be expected to be characterized as a primitive member of the primates. However, due to the specializations of its incisors of P. janisae it is considered by some investigators as a basal member of the Pleasiadapiformes sensu lato.

A phylogenetic analysis of 177 mammal taxa (mostly Cretaceous and Palaeocene fossils), published in 2015, suggests that Purgatorius may not be closely related to primates at all, but instead falls outside crown-group placentals - specifically as the sister taxon to Protungulatum. Similar results had been obtained in previous studies with far fewer species. But this study had been criticized and refuted by subsequent authors and their studies.

Notes

References

External links
"Oldest primate fossils indicate our ancestors walked with dinosaurs ". Includes artist's illustration of Purgatorius mckeeveri, a newly described species of early primate. New Atlas, March 01, 2021 

Cretaceous mammals
Paleocene mammals
Paleocene genus extinctions
Cretaceous mammals of North America
Paleocene mammals of North America
Hell Creek fauna
Fossil taxa described in 1965
Prehistoric primate genera